Lipka  is a village in Złotów County, Greater Poland Voivodeship, in northwestern Poland. It is the seat of the gmina (administrative district) called Gmina Lipka.

Before 1772 the area was part of Kingdom of Poland, 1772-1945 Prussia and Germany. For more on its history, see Złotów County. From 1975 to 1998 the village belonged to Piła Voivodeship.

Lipka has a population of approximately 2,200.

History 
Since 1871, the village, known in German as Linde, belonged to Germany and grew as a result of the construction of the Prussian Eastern Railway, with the railway station located in the village serving as the main station for the town of Preussisch Friedland (Debrzno) and numerous other market towns.

In the 19th century, potato cultivation was an essential livelihood for the residents of Linde, whose products went as far as the Ruhr area and the Netherlands. A starch factory, building material works, a brickworks and a dairy were some other businesses in the village. At the end of the 19th century, the first electrically powered threshing machine in Prussia was used here. Until 1945, Linde was a town in the Flatow district in the administrative region of Posen-West Prussia in the Province of Pomerania. In 1939, the village had 1,613 residents.

Towards the end of World War II, the Red Army occupied the region in the spring of 1945. After the war, the village was renamed Lipka.

References

External links
Lipka website
Forum
Middle school in Lipka

Villages in Złotów County